Shanita Namuyimbwa, also known as Bad Black, is a Ugandan socialite, commercial sex worker, and extravagant spender.

Background and education
Namuyimbwa, whose real name is Latifah Nalukenge, was born on 27 December 1989, in Zana, Uganda, along Kampala–Entebbe Road. She attended Midland Primary School, in Kawempe, a neighborhood in the north of Kampala, Uganda's capital city. She dropped out of Senior 2 (equivalent of Final Year in Middle School), allegedly due to lack of school fees. It is not clear which secondary school she was attending.

Career as a sex worker
In her own courthouse testimony, under oath, Shanita became a sex worker in 2005. Prior to that, she had tried several different trades, including hawking merchandise on the streets of Kampala.

According to Shanita, she averaged US$200 a day, servicing three clients every 24 hours on average. Weekends were better than weekdays. She targeted Caucasian men "because they had dollars, which I was most interested in". She operated mainly from Kampala Speke Hotel

Shanita Namuyimbwa meets David Greenhalgh
In June 2009 at the Rock Gardens in Speke Hotel, in central Kampala, Shanita Namuyimbwa, age 19.5 years met David Greenhalgh, age 51 years, a married British businessman from Burgess Hill, West Sussex, England and a father of two. The two developed a mutual attraction and exchanged telephone numbers. Later they had drinks and spent the night together after negotiating and agreeing on a price.

In a period of a few months, the relationship blossomed from a commercial sex affair to a mistress affair. He opened bank accounts in her name, both in Ugandan shillings and United States Dollars. He bought her a house in Munyonyo, an upscale neighborhood of Kampala, on the northern shores of Lake Nalubaale (formerly Lake Victoria). He funded joint trips for both of them to exotic destinations, including Nairobi, Kenya and Dubai, United Arab Emirates. He also deposited and had other people deposit over US$4 million in the bank accounts to which she was a signatory. Namuyimbwa became pregnant by David Greenhalgh.

Legal trouble
In late 2011, less than 18 months after they first met, David Greenhalgh filed a case of Embezzlement against Namuyimbwa. Jointly charged with her was one Meddie Ssentongo, a Kampala businessman.

Hearing of the case before Justice Catherine Bamugemereire, kicked off in February 2012, at the Anti Corruption Division of the High Court of Uganda, in Kampala. In July 2012, Shanita was convicted of embezzling USh 11 billion (US$3,824,130 at that time), from the bank account of Davishan Development Uganda Limited, a company where Greenhalgh owned 75 percent shareholding and Namuyimbwa owned 25 percent. Shanita's co-accused, Medi Ssentongo 
was convicted of conspiring to defraud the company.

The judge sentenced Namuyimbwa to four years in prison for embezzlement and Medi Ssentongo was sentenced to 18 months in prison for conspiracy to defraud.

Life after prison
After she served her four-year sentence, she was released from prison on 14 March 2016. None of the nearly US$3.9 million that she was convicted of embezzling was recovered.

Other brushes with the law included her arrest at Kigali International Airport in October 2013, on an Interpol arrest warrant, for jumping bail in Kampala. She was extradited back to Uganda.

In 2020, during the COVID-19 lockdowns, Bad Black made a video recording of herself urging other prostitutes in the country to avoid contact with long-distance truck drivers, who have exhibited a high prevalence rate of the disease among them. The Uganda Ministry of Health was of the view that her appearance was pro bono, but she insisted that she should be paid for her appearance. When payment was not forthcoming, she threatened to start releasing names of high-ranking government officials who have used her services. Eventually she received payment for her services through Balaam Barugahare, a music promoter. Bad Black acknowledged being paid. The amount of the payment was not disclosed.

Family
As of August 2020, Namuyimbwa was the mother of three children: 1. A daughter born circa 2007, whose father is a Ugandan of African descent 2. A son born in January 2010, whose father is a Portuguese of Caucasian descent and 3. A son born in May 2012, whose father is David Greenhalgh, a British citizen of Caucasian descent. All three men were at one time clients of the children's mother.

See also
 Prostitution in Uganda

References

External links
 Bad Black: The brazen socialite wreaking havoc in Kampala As of July 2019.

1989 births
Living people
Socialites
21st-century Ugandan businesswomen
21st-century Ugandan businesspeople
Ugandan women in business
Ugandan prostitutes
Ugandan criminals